La Prairie is a provincial electoral district in Quebec, Canada that elects members to the National Assembly of Quebec.  It notably consists of the city of La Prairie and three other smaller cities.  Prior to 1988, it was spelled as one word: Laprairie.

It was originally created for the 1867 election (and an electoral district of that name existed earlier in the Legislative Assembly of the Province of Canada and the Legislative Assembly of Lower Canada).  Its final election was in 1919.  It disappeared in the 1923 election and its successor electoral district was Napierville-Laprairie.  It was recreated in for the 1973 election from parts of Chambly and Napierville-Laprairie.

In the change from the 2001 to the 2011 electoral map, it lost Saint-Constant and Saint-Mathieu to the newly created Sanguinet electoral district.

Members of the Legislative Assembly / National Assembly

Election results

|}

References

External links
Information
 Elections Quebec

Election results
 Election results (National Assembly)
 Election results (Elections Quebec)

Maps
 2011 map (PDF)
 2001 map (Flash)
2001–2011 changes (Flash)
1992–2001 changes (Flash)
 Electoral map of Montérégie region
 Quebec electoral map, 2011

La Prairie, Quebec
Quebec provincial electoral districts